Liu Deyou (born January 1937) is a Chinese politician and translator.

Biography
Liu was born in Dalian, Liaoning under Japanese rule, in January 1937. In the winter of 1952, Liu was transferred to Beijing from Dalian and worked in People's China magazine. He began his translation career during that time.

From the mid-1950s to the mid-1960s, he often served as an interpreter when Mao Zedong, Zhou Enlai, Chen Yi, Wang Zhen and Guo Moruo met with foreign guests or held talks. In 1956, he served as simultaneous interpreter at the 8th National Congress of the Communist Party of China. He also visited Japan with delegations led by Guo Moruo, Wang Zhen and Ba Jin, respectively.

In 1964, as a reporter of Guangming Daily, he became one of the first Chinese journalists stationed in Japan. From September 1964 to June 1974, he was the first reporter of Guangming Daily in Tokyo, Japan. From June 1972 to June 1978, he was the chief journalist of the Tokyo Branch of Xinhua News Agency. In 1986, he was promoted to vice-minister of the Ministry of Culture of the People's Republic of China. 

Later, he served as president of the Chinese-Japanese Society and president of the Chinese Cultural Fellowship.

On November 19, 2018, he was awarded the Lifetime Achievement Award in Translation, one of the most prestigious translation prizes in China.

Works

Awards
 23 June 2000 2nd Class, Order of the Rising Sun
 2003 International Exchange Meritorious Person Award

References

1937 births
Politicians from Dalian
Living people
Writers from Dalian
People's Republic of China politicians from Liaoning
Chinese Communist Party politicians from Liaoning
Japanese–Chinese translators